The North Gwent Deanery, a Roman Catholic deanery in the Archdiocese of Cardiff in Wales, covers several churches in North Gwent and the surrounding area. In the early 2000s, the Head of the Valleys deanery was split. The churches in its western part, in the county boroughs of Merthyr Tydfi and Rhondda Cynon Taf, became part of the Pontypridd Deanery and the churches in its eastern part, in the county borough of Blaenau Gwent, became part of the North Gwent Deanery.

The dean is centred at Our Lady of Peace Parish in Newbridge, Caerphilly.

Churches 

 Our Lady and St Michael, Abergavenny - served from Belmont Abbey
 St Mary and St Michael, Llanarth - served from Abergavenny
 St Mary, Abertillery
 St Mary, Brynmawr - served from Abertillery
 Our Lady of the Angels, Cwmbran
 St David, Cwmbran - served from Our Lady of the Angels
 St Mary, Monmouth
 St Francis of Rome, Ross-on-Wye - served from Monmouth
 Our Lady of Peace, Newbridge
 The Sacred Heart, Pontllanfraith - served from Newbridge
 St Anthony of Padua and St Clare, Risca - served from Newbridge
 St Alban, Pontypool
 The Sacred Heart and St Felix, Blaenavon - served from Pontypool
 The Immaculate Conception, Tredegar
 All Saints, Ebbw Vale - served from Tredegar
 St John, Rhymney - served from Tredegar
 St David Lewis and St Francis Xavier Church, Usk

Gallery

References

External links
 Archdiocese of Cardiff site
 Our Lady and Saint Michael’s Parish site
 St Alban Parish site
 Our Lady of the Angels Parish site
 St Mary Parish Monmouth Site
 St Francis of Rome Church site
 Our Lady of Peace Parish site
 Immaculate Conception Parish site

Roman Catholic Deaneries in the Archdiocese of Cardiff